Arthur Gostick Shorrock (1861–1945) was a Baptist missionary who worked in China for 40 years. Arthur was born in 1861 in Blackburn, Lancashire, England. He entered Spurgeon's College and as a student preacher took services at the Baptist Chapel in Wraysbury. There he met his future wife, Maud Doulton, a relative of both Henry Doulton the pottery manufacturer and William Thomas Buckland the Wraysbury auctioneer. Arthur then left to become a missionary in China before returning to live in Wraysbury after his retirement.

Missionary work in China
Arthur joined the Baptist Missionary Society and went to China in 1887, firstly to Shantung.  In 1897 he journeyed to India with one of China's most influential Baptist missionaries, Timothy Richard.  Richard hoped to see the conditions of mission work in India and was pleased to have the "able and earnest" young missionary as a traveling companion.  They visited Sri Lanka, Madras, Agra, Varanasi, Delhi, Mumbai and Kolkata, where Arthur "had a sharp attack of cholera, narrowly escaping with his life."

Shaanxi Baptist Mission
In 1892 Arthur Shorrock and Moir Duncan founded the Sianfu Mission, in present-day Xi'an, Shaanxi Province. Arthur was responsible for the Baptist mission work in Shaanxi and became the Principal of the Shaanxi Bible College. In 1898 Moir Duncan and his wife returned to England on a furlough. Maud Doulton, who was attending the Royal Holloway College before graduating in 1890, was then engaged to Arthur. She left England in January 1900 accompanied by the Duncans. Arthur and Maud were married soon after arriving in Shanghai and they and the Duncans arrived back in Xi'an on 24 May 1900. Seven weeks later, on 6 July they were forced to leave the city secretly to escape the Taiyuan Massacre during the Boxer Rebellion.

Two years later they returned and Maud then took responsibility for 'Women's Work', and in 1914 became principal of the church's Girls' High School in Xi'an. Up until shortly before Arthur Shorrock left China, the following missionaries had worked with him:

Together with the Chinese members they established the following:

War against opium
Arthur was horrified by the impact of the opium trade. In 1890 he was a founding member of the Permanent Committee for the Promotion of Anti-Opium Societies. Fellow committee members included the prominent missionaries John Glasgow Kerr MD, American Presbyterian Mission in Canton; B.C. Atterbury MD, American Presbyterian Mission in Peking; Archdeacon Arthur Evans Moule, Church Missionary Society in Shanghai; Henry Whitney MD, American Board of Commissioners for foreign Missions in Foochow; the Rev Samuel Clarke, China Inland Mission in Kweiyang and the Rev Griffith John, London Missionary Society in Hankow. They resolved to continue their opposition to the opium traffic, urging Christians in China to arouse public opinion against it.  The desire of the missionaries that their ideas be carried out caused them to form "continuation committees" that were assigned tasks to assure that action would be taken on whatever matters had been approved by the conferences. 
He continued working with other missionaries opposed to the opium trade, including writing to Alexander Hosie about poppy cultivation and corruption associated with attempts to end the cultivation.

Xinhai Revolution 
Once the Xinhai Revolution reached Shaanxi, resulting in the death of eight foreigners, an evacuation of all missionaries and other foreigners in the region was planned.  The Rev J C Keyte and the explorer Arthur de Carle Sowerby planned the relief expedition, and all but a handful of the mission was successfully evacuated due to their efforts.  However, Arthur, Maud and their daughter Mary remained in Shaanxi.  Arthur gave the following reason for remaining: -

Anti-Christian movement

Arthur's contributions to China were rewarded with the awarding of the Order of the Excellent Crop, Third Class, conferred upon him by the President of the Republic of China in 1917. Popular sentiment in the 1920s in China was directed against missionaries, foreign merchants, Christian schools, churches and hospitals which were viewed as 'imperialistic'.

Arthur Shorrock helped organise the 1925 Shensi Baptist Conference, writing a book that argued that missionaries were not imperialist. At the time he wrote:

Many missionaries were forced to leave China in the following years. For the Baptist Missionary Society such experiences resulted in them becoming more sensitive to the political situation of different mission fields.

Evangelical methods
The evangelical methods used at the time in Shaanxi were described as follows:

Return to England

While missionaries and other foreigners were besieged in Sianfu,
Arthur's wife, Maude, died on 25 September 1925 of typhoid. After his retirement, he returned to Wraysbury and became the minister of the Baptist Chapel there. He died on 13 June 1945 in Windsor, aged 83, and is buried in Wraysbury together with his wife.

References

External links
Tait Papers: <archival description of the papers of Ruth Tait>; National Library of Scotland. Mundus: gateway to missionary collections in the United Kingdom (Ruth Tait was a medical missionary in a hospital in Sian)
Young, George Armstrong: <archival description of the papers of George Armstrong Young>; Centre for the Study of Christianity in the Non-Western World, University of Edinburgh. Mundus: gateway to missionary collections in the United Kingdom (George Young was involved in the establishment of the Sian Christian Fellowship and the Sian Bible Training Institute)
 

1861 births
1945 deaths
English Baptist missionaries
Baptist missionaries in China
Missionary educators
People from Blackburn
19th-century Baptists
20th-century Baptists
British expatriates in China
Alumni of Spurgeon's College